Lillian Preece married name Parrington (1 April 1928 – July 2004) was a British swimmer. She competed at the 1948 Summer Olympics and the 1952 Summer Olympics.

She also represented England and won a bronze medal in the 440 Yard Freestyle Relay at the 1950 British Empire Games in Auckland, New Zealand. She won the 1952 ASA National Championship 220 yards freestyle title.

References

1928 births
2004 deaths
British female swimmers
Olympic swimmers of Great Britain
Swimmers at the 1948 Summer Olympics
Swimmers at the 1952 Summer Olympics
Sportspeople from Stockport
Commonwealth Games medallists in swimming
Commonwealth Games bronze medallists for England
Swimmers at the 1950 British Empire Games
Medallists at the 1950 British Empire Games